

The indigobirds and whydahs, together with the cuckoo-finch, make up the family Viduidae; they are small passerine birds native to Africa.

These are finch-like species which usually have black or indigo predominating in their plumage. The birds named "whydahs" have long or very long tails in the breeding male.

All are obligate brood parasites, which lay their eggs in the nests of estrildid finch species; most indigobirds use firefinches as hosts, whereas the paradise whydahs chose pytilias. Unlike the cuckoos and honeyguides, the indigobirds and whydahs do not destroy the host's eggs. Typically, they lay 2–4 eggs in with those already present. The eggs of both the host and the victim are white, although the indigobird's are slightly larger. Many of the indigo-plumaged species named "indigobirds" are very similar in appearance, with the males difficult to separate in the field, and the young and females near impossible. The best guide is often the estrildid finch with which they are associating, since each indigobird parasitises a different host species. For example, the village indigobird is usually found with red-billed firefinches. Indigobirds and whydahs imitate their host's song, which the males learn in the nest. Although females do not sing, they also learn to recognise the song, and choose males with the same song, thus perpetuating the link between each species of indigobird and firefinch. The nestling indigobirds mimic the unique gape pattern of the fledglings of the host species.

The matching with the host is the driving force behind speciation in this family, but the close genetic and morphological similarities among species suggest that they are of recent origin.

The family contains two genera:

References

Sources

External links
 Whydahs and indigobirds (Viduidae) information, including 7 species with videos and 9 with photographs at the Internet Bird Collection
Indigobirds.com

 
Bird families
Brood parasites